Cryptophagus scanicus is a species of silken fungus beetle native to Europe.

References

External links
Images representing Cryptophagus at BOLD

Cryptophagidae
Beetles described in 1758
Beetles of Europe
Taxa named by Carl Linnaeus